Flying Aces is a steel roller coaster at Ferrari World in Abu Dhabi, United Arab Emirates. It was manufactured by Intamin and opened on 24 February 2016.

Characteristics

Ride experience
Immediately after the drop, the train then turns right and enters a  non-inverting loop. The train then travels through several banked turns and hills before entering a heartline roll near the end of the ride. Shortly after the heartline roll, the train enters the final brake run.

Trains
The trains used on Flying Aces feature seven rows, each seating four riders. This makes for a total capacity of 28 riders per train. Flying Aces is the second Wing Coaster by Intamin, following Skyrush at Hersheypark.

See also
2016 in amusement parks
List of Intamin rides
Skyrush, another Intamin coaster with similar trains

References

Roller coasters in the United Arab Emirates